Sphagnum novo-caledoniae is a species of plant in the family Sphagnaceae. It is endemic to New Caledonia.  Its natural habitat is rivers.

It has been proposed that S. novo-caledoniae be transferred to genus Flatbergium in family Flatbergiaceae.

References

Endemic flora of New Caledonia
novo-caledoniae
Vulnerable plants
Taxonomy articles created by Polbot